Michael Claude Aukett (1938-2020) was a British architect who established a successful architecture practice Michael Aukett Associates in 1972, later becoming Aukett Plc.

Career
Aukett started his career in 1965 at Austin-Smith:Lord where he quickly became a partner.

In 1972 he established his own practice Michael Aukett Associates (now Aukett Swanke). The practice developed as a multi-disciplinary practice and went public in 1987. He left the practice in 1995 to start a new smaller office Michael Aukett Architects.

He retired in 2009.

Notable buildings
 Lennox Wood Computer Centre, Horsham (1984)
 Marks and Spencer Management Centre, Chester (1989)
 Proctor and Gamble HQ, Weybridge (1995)
 Tesco, Sheffield (1998)

Personal life
Aukett was born and grew up in Brentford Middlesex and studied architecture part time at London's Regent Street Polytechnic (now University of Westminster), completing in 1962. He had a love of sport and was a long time member of the MCC. He was married twice.   Michael Claude Aukett died on 27 October 2020:  his funeral, attended by both his sons and both his daughters, as well as his former wife and current wife, took place on 7 November 2020 at Poole in Dorset, England,

References

1938 births
2020 deaths
Architects from London
Modernist architects
High-tech architecture
Alumni of the University of Westminster